The Old Midtown Historic District is a historic district in the Midtown neighborhood of Harrisburg, Pennsylvania. The district is located from Forster to Verbeke, and Front to Third street. It represents the first urbanized neighborhood in the city of Harrisburg. The Historic Harrisburg Association first lobbied for its creation in 1974. The area of Third street near Verbeke is known as the Historic Midtown Market District and is home to many unique boutiques, galleries and shops. Former Harrisburg Mayor William K. Verbeke is the namesake for Verbeke Street (formerly Broad Street) and first bought and developed the area.

Places of Note
 Broad Street Market
 Harrisburg Midtown Arts Center
 Historic Harrisburg Resource Center
 Holocaust Memorial
 Sunken Gardens at Riverfront Park

See also
 List of Harrisburg neighborhoods

References

External links
 Friends of Midtown
 HarrisburgPA.gov—City Wide Sights: Historic Midtown and Old Uptown
[ National Register - Inventory]

Houses on the National Register of Historic Places in Pennsylvania
Federal architecture in Pennsylvania
Historic districts in Harrisburg, Pennsylvania
Houses in Dauphin County, Pennsylvania
Historic districts on the National Register of Historic Places in Pennsylvania
National Register of Historic Places in Harrisburg, Pennsylvania